Woody Brown (born February 26, 1956) is an American actor, best known for his role as Skipper Weldon in the 1980s television series Flamingo Road.

Brown was born in Dayton, Ohio, and attended the University of Michigan, where he played football as a defensive back, helping the Wolverines make two Rose Bowl appearances, and one Orange Bowl.

Other TV credits include: Love of Life, The Love Boat, Knight Rider, The Facts of Life, Dynasty, JAG and Roswell.

References

External links
 

1956 births
Living people
American male television actors
Male actors from Dayton, Ohio
Circle in the Square Theatre School alumni